In enzymology, an alkylglycerone kinase is an enzyme that catalyzes the chemical reaction

ATP + O-alkylglycerone  ADP + O-alkylglycerone phosphate

Thus, the two substrates of this enzyme are ATP and O-alkylglycerone, whereas its two products are ADP and O-alkylglycerone phosphate.

This enzyme belongs to the family of transferases, specifically those transferring phosphorus-containing groups (phosphotransferases) with an alcohol group as acceptor.  The systematic name of this enzyme class is ATP:O-alkylglycerone phosphotransferase. Other names in common use include alkyldihydroxyacetone kinase (phosphorylating), and alkyldihydroxyacetone kinase.

References

 

EC 2.7.1
Enzymes of unknown structure